The LaSalle Apartments, also called Ivy Manor, is a historic apartment building in Virginia, Minnesota, United States.  It was built in 1924.  In 2017 it was listed  on the National Register of Historic Places for its local significance in the theme of community planning and development.  It was nominated for exemplifying the emergence of multi-unit housing for middle-class urbanites in the early 20th century.

See also
 National Register of Historic Places listings in St. Louis County, Minnesota

References

1924 establishments in Minnesota
Apartment buildings in Minnesota
Buildings and structures in Virginia, Minnesota
National Register of Historic Places in St. Louis County, Minnesota
Residential buildings completed in 1924
Residential buildings on the National Register of Historic Places in Minnesota